Yurii Grigorievich Reshetnyak (26 September 1929 – 17 December 2021) was a Soviet and Russian mathematician and academician.

He worked in geometry and the theory of functions of a real variable. He was known for his work in the Reshetnyak gluing theorem. Reshetnyak received the 2000 Lobachevsky Prize from the Russian Academy of Sciences.

Reshetnyak died on 17 December 2021, at the age of 92.

Selected publications

with A. D. Aleksandrov:

References

1929 births
2021 deaths
Mathematicians from Saint Petersburg
Soviet mathematicians